Robert Myddelton Biddulph (20 June 1805 – 21 March 1872) was a British landowner and Member of Parliament for the Liberal Party.

Early life
He was the elder son of Robert Myddelton Biddulph (1761–1814) of Burghill by his wife Charlotte Myddelton of Chirk Castle, Denbighshire. He was educated at Eton College. He succeeded his father in 1814 and his mother in 1843, inheriting the Chirk estate.  His younger brother was Thomas Myddelton Biddulph (1809–1878), an officer in the British Army and courtier.

Career
He was Member of Parliament for Denbigh Boroughs from 1830 to 1832 and for Denbighshire from 1832 to 1835 and from 1852 to 1868.

He was Colonel of the Royal Denbigh Rifles Militia from 1840, Lord Lieutenant of Denbighshire from 1841, and an aide-de-camp to Queen Victoria from 1869, holding all these offices until his death.

Personal life
On 31 May 1832, he married Frances Mostyn-Owen, daughter of William Mostyn-Owen of Woodhouse in Shropshire, and granddaughter of William Mostyn Owen ( 1742–1795), a Member of Parliament for Montgomeryshire. They had three sons (one of whom predeceased him) and three daughters. His children included:

 Mary Caroline Myddelton Biddulph (d. 1890)
 Richard Myddelton Biddulph (1837–1913), who married Catherine Arabella Howard (d. 1899), granddaughter of Edward Charles Howard (a younger brother of Bernard Howard, 12th Duke of Norfolk).

At his death, his eldest son, Richard, succeeded to Chirk Castle, his wife inherited his London house at 35 Grosvenor Place, and his brother Thomas received a life interest in the estate at Burghill.

An 1869 portrait by Henry Richard Graves was presented to Biddulph's widow in 1873. It was acquired by the National Trust in 2004 and is in the Myddelton collection at Chirk.

Descendants
His grandchildren included Agnes Mary Myddelton Biddulph (d. 1920), Catherine Myddelton Biddulph (d. 1889), Colonel Robert Edward Myddelton (1866-1949), and Algernon Hugh Myddelton Biddulph (1872-1906). Agnes married Hedworth Trelawny Barclay, son of Alexander Charles Barclay, and was the mother of Vera Agnes Barclay who married Captain Honourable Thomas James Amherst Cecil (1887–1955), son of Lord William Cecil, the younger son of William Cecil, 3rd Marquess of Exeter.

References
Notes

Sources
 Margaret Escott, MYDDELTON BIDDULPH, Robert (1805-1872), of Chirk Castle, Denb. and 35 Grosvenor Place, Mdx. in The House of Commons 1820-1832, History of Parliament, 2009.

External links
 
 

1805 births
1872 deaths
Myddelton family
People educated at Eton College
UK MPs 1830–1831
UK MPs 1831–1832
UK MPs 1832–1835
UK MPs 1852–1857
UK MPs 1857–1859
UK MPs 1859–1865
UK MPs 1865–1868
Members of the Parliament of the United Kingdom for Denbighshire
Members of the Parliament of the United Kingdom for Denbigh Boroughs
People from Wrexham
Lord-Lieutenants of Denbighshire
Whig (British political party) MPs for English constituencies